Maranghada is a village in the Khunti CD block in the Khunti Sadar subdivision of the Khunti district in the Indian state of Jharkhand.

Geography

Location
Maranghada is located at

Area overview
In the adjacent map the area shown is “undulating and covered with hills, hillocks and jungles (jungles/ forests are shown as shaded area in the map). The soil of the area is rocky, sandy and red loam upland. There are paddy fields only in the depressions. In 2011, it had a density of population of 210 persons per sq km. Khunti is an overwhelmingly rural district with 91.5% of the population living in rural areas. Famous places in this area are Ulihatu, the birth place of Bhagwan Birsa Munda, and Dombari Buru, the central point of his activity.

Note: The map alongside presents some of the notable locations in the district. All places marked in the map are linked in the larger full screen map.

Civic administration

Police station
There is a police station at Maranghada.

Demographics
According to the 2011 Census of India, Maranghada had a total population of 962, of which 513 (53%) were males and 449 (47%) were females. Population in the age range 0–6 years was 178 The total number of literate persons in Maranghada was 463 (59.07% of the population over 6 years).

(*For language details see Khunti block#Language and religion)

Education
High School Maranghada is a Hindi-medium coeducational institution established in 1968. It has facilities for teaching in classes IX and X. The school has a playground and a library with 435 books.

Healthcare
There is a Primary Health Centre in Maranghada.

References

Villages in Khunti district